Trigonostemon is a plant genus of the family Euphorbiaceae and the sole member of its tribe (Trigonostemoneae). It was first described as a genus in 1826. It is native to Southeast Asia, southern China, the Indian Subcontinent, Queensland, and a few islands in the western Pacific.

Species

formerly included
moved to other genera (Cleidion Croton Dimorphocalyx Omphalea Paracroton Wetria )

References

Euphorbiaceae genera
Crotonoideae